Elections to Orkney Islands Council were held on 3 May 2007, the same day as the Scottish local government elections and the Scottish Parliament general election. The election was the first one using six new wards created as a result of the Local Governance (Scotland) Act 2004, each ward elects three or four councillors using a single transferable vote system form of proportional representation. The new wards replace 21 single-member wards which used the plurality (first past the post) system of election.

All the seats were won by independent candidates.

Election results

Ward results

Kirkwall East

Kirkwall West and Orphir

Stromness and South Isles

West Mainland

East Mainland, South Ronaldsay and Burray

North Isles

References

2007 Scottish local elections
2007
21st century in Orkney